Oak Grove is a census-designated place in Loudoun County, Virginia, United States. The population as of the 2010 United States Census was 1,777.

Oak Grove is located in eastern Loudoun County, on the Fairfax County border, between the communities of Sterling Park and Herndon. The Washington and Old Dominion Railroad once travelled through the community, now replaced by the Washington & Old Dominion Railroad Trail.

References

Census-designated places in Loudoun County, Virginia
Washington metropolitan area
Census-designated places in Virginia